Google One is a subscription service developed by Google that offers expanded cloud storage and is intended for the consumer market. Google One paid plans offer cloud storage starting at 100 gigabytes, up to a maximum of 30 terabytes, an expansion from the free Google Account storage space of 15 GB, which is shared across Google Drive, Gmail, and Google Photos. Launched in May 2018, Google One replaced the paid services of Google Drive to emphasize the fact that the program is used by multiple Google Services. The program's raw storage is not accessible by users, but emails, files, and pictures can be added and removed through Gmail, Google Drive, and Google Photos.

History 
Google One was launched in May 2018. The 1 TB plan for Google Drive would be upgraded to 2 TB, while the 2 TB plan's price would be the same price as Google Drive's 1 TB plan (US$9.99). Google also announced that 24/7 support would be available with all Google One plans. From May to August 2018, Google began upgrading Google Drive users in the United States to Google One. On August 15, 2018, Google announced that all users could get access to Google One in the U.S. for free, but would not receive any member benefits or upgraded storage.

On October 29, 2020, Google added a VPN service to Google One users on a 2 TB plan or higher. It was launched in the United States on Android and later rolled out to more countries and iOS, Windows and MacOS. In January 2023, the Google One app passed one billion downloads on Android. In February 2023, the Magic Eraser editing feature in Google Photos (previously exclusive to Pixel 6 and 7 owners) was made available to all Google One users. In March 2023, Google expanded access to the VPN service to all plans and added a dark web monitoring feature for US users.

Features 
Users with a paid plan are able to get:
 Support from "Google experts" for Google services. The support is open 24/7 and is available over chat, email, and phone. 
 Automatic phone backup on Android through the Google One app.
 Virtual private network (VPN) service which works as a privacy and security tool that encrypts users' web traffic and masks their IP addresses. It is available in select countries.
 Dark web monitoring which scans the dark web for the user's personal information. US users only.
 Enhanced editing features such as Magic Eraser, portrait light, blur, and color pop are available on Google Photos.
 Ability for up to five additional family members to share a Google one subscription.
 Up to 10% cashback on purchases from the Google Store for users in the 200 GB and 2 TB plans.
 Google Play credits and other benefits from Google services.

Storage 
The storage managed by Google One is used by Gmail, Google Drive, and Google Photos. There is regional pricing, meaning some countries can get storage plans for cheaper, and some more expensive.

The storage plans offered by Google are:

Storage purchases renew automatically at the end of the subscription period. Users can upgrade their storage plan anytime, with the new storage tier taking effect immediately. Storage can also be shared with up to 5 additional family members, with each person getting the default 15 GB. Files count towards the free default storage before counting towards shared storage. Many items do not take up any space: Shared files or files in "Shared with me" only use up the owner's quota. Google Pixel phones up to the Pixel 5 allow users to back up an unlimited number of videos and photos that don't count towards the quota. Users of the Google One service also see an addition to their account's avatar icon of a four-color circular surround made up of the company's blue-red-yellow-green color, scheme to denote their status.

On November 11, 2020, Google announced it would phase out unlimited storage from the "High quality" (renamed "Storage saver") and "Express quality" settings in Google Photos and Google Docs Editors file formats (except for Google Sites) stored in Google Drive. These changes took effect on June 1, 2021. Photos, videos and Docs Editors files uploaded before June 1 remain unaffected, while newer ones will count towards the user's storage quota.

References

2018 establishments
2018 software
Cloud storage
One
One
Subscription services